U.S. Route 1 (US 1) in the U.S. state of Georgia, which is concurrent for almost its entire length with State Route 4 (SR 4), is a highway traversing south–north through portions of Charlton, Ware, Bacon, Appling, Toombs, Emanuel, Jefferson, and Richmond counties in the southeastern and east-central parts of the state. In Georgia, the highway originates at US 1/US 23/US 301/State Road 15 (SR 15) at the St. Marys River and the Florida state line, where SR 4 reach their southern terminus. It travels to the Savannah River at South Carolina state line in Augusta where the route continues to North Augusta, South Carolina. Here, SR 10 reaches its eastern terminus.

Route description

Charlton County

SR 4 begins at the Florida state line, at a bridge over the St. Marys River, which is south-southeast of Folkston. This is where US 1/US 23/US 301/SR 15 enter Georgia from Florida. US 1, US 23, US 301, SR 4, and SR 15 travel to the north-northwest as the Public Safety and Veterans Highway through rural parts of Charlton County. Immediately, they pass Lake Deborah to the east. They curve to the northwest for a brief portion. Just before entering Folkston, where they use the Second Street name, they resume their north-northwest direction. They have an intersection with the southern terminus of Third Street, a former portion of US 1. They pass an office for Georgia Power. At an intersection with Bay Street, they enter the main part of the city. They intersect the western terminus of SR 40 (Main Street). This intersection is just west of the Charlton County Courthouse. One block later is Love Street, a former portion of SR 252. Just north of Garden Street, they curve to the north-northeast. They then intersect SR 23/SR 121, which join the concurrency. This is one of a few seven-highway concurrencies in the state. The seven highways continue to the north-northeast. Just after curving back to the north-northwest, they intersect the western terminus of SR 40 Connector (SR 40 Conn.; Indian Trail). At this intersection, they pass the Charlton County Library. They then use the Okefenokee Trail as their path. They cross over Clay Branch just before intersecting the eastern terminus of Bowery Lane and the western terminus of Homeland Park Road. This intersection leads to the Okefenokee Industrial Park, the Charlton County Community Service Center, and the city hall of Homeland. Just north of Robin Lane, they leave Folkston and enter Homeland. Immediately, US 301 and SR 23 continue to the north-northwest, while US 1, US 23, SR 4, SR 15, and SR 121 curve to the west-northwest on the Woodpecker Trail. They cross over some railroad tracks of CSX Transportation. An intersection with the northern terminus of Dogwood Lane leads to the Homeland City Hall. At Louis West Lane, the highways leave Homeland and resume traveling through rural parts of the county. They cross over Little Spanish Creek and then Winding Branch. They intersect the southern terminus of Crews Road and the northern terminus of Old Dixie Highway, a former portion of US 1. Just after this intersection is a crossing over Spanish Creek. They curve to the north-northwest. They cross over Melton Branch. Then, in Racepond, SR 15/SR 121 splits off to the north-northeast, while US 1, US 23, and SR 4 continue to the north-northwest. They curve to a northwesterly direction and enter Ware County.

Ware County

US 1, US 23, and SR 4 cross over Gum Slough and then curve more to the west-northwest. They travel through Fort Mudge and the Dixon Memorial State Forest. They curve to the north-northwest and then intersect SR 177. They cross over Mill Creek before entering the southeastern part of Waycross.

Immediately, they pass an office of the Georgia Department of Corrections. Just before an intersection with the western terminus of Osburn Road, they curve back to the northwest. Just past The Mall at Waycross, they curve to the west-northwest. Just before an intersection with City Boulevard, they curve back to the northwest. They intersect the southern terminus of US 1 Business (US 1 Bus.)/US 23 Bus./SR 4 Bus. (Memorial Drive) and US 82/SR 520 (South Georgia Parkway). US 1/US 23/SR 4 turn left onto US 82/SR 520 and travel concurrently with them. The five-highway concurrency travels to the west-southwest. Immediately, they curve to the west-northwest. An intersection with the southern terminus of Wilkerson Street leads to Memorial Stadium. The next street, Blackwell Street, leads to an office of the Okefenokee Humane Society. Between an intersection with the northern terminus of Amanda Street and one with the northern terminus of Morton Avenue, they cross over the city's drainage canal. An intersection with Lee Street leads to the downtown business district. An intersection with Brunel Street leads to the Obediah Barber Homestead and Swamp Road. At an intersection with Stephenson Street, the five highways curve to the northwest. On this curve, they travel on a bridge over Haines Avenue, some railroad tracks of CSX Transportation, and US 84/SR 38 (Plant Avenue). Immediately after this bridge, they curve back to the west-northwest. At McDonald Street, US 84 and SR 38 join the concurrency. The seven highways, US 1, US 23, US 82, US 84, SR 4, SR 38, and SR 520, continue to the west-northwest. At an intersection with Nicholls Street, they curve to the west-southwest and travel on a bridge over some railroad tracks of CSX Transportation. Just pass this bridge, they curve to the west-northwest. At Victory Drive, US 84 and SR 38 depart to the south. Just past this intersection, there is one with the southern terminus of South Augusta Avenue. Here, the highways pass South Georgia State College's Waycross campus. Between an intersection with the southern terminus of University Boulevard and one with Anita Street, they leave the city limits of Waycross.

Just west of Anita Street, they curve back to the west-southwest. They cross over Kettle Creek. A short distance later, they curve to the north-northwest. They intersect the eastern terminus of SR 122 (Carswell Avenue). They curve to the north-northeast and travel on a bridge over some railroad tracks of St. Mary's West Railroad. Immediately afterward, they travel on a bridge over Albany Avenue. The highways curve to the north-northwest and come to an intersection with Scapa Road. Here, US 1, US 23, and SR 4 turn right to the northeast, while US 82 and SR 520 continue straight ahead. Almost immediately, they intersect the western terminus of Fulford Road, which leads to the Ware County Sheriff's Office, the Southland Waste Transfer Station, the Ware County Emergency Management Agency, and the Waycross Regional Youth Detention Center. The three highways curve to the north-northwest and pass the Waycross–Ware County Industrial Park West. They curve to the west-northwest for a short distance and then curve to the northeast. They intersect the northern terminus of US 1 Bus./US 23 Bus./SR 4 Bus. (Alma Highway). The mainline highways head to the north-northwest and cross over Cox Creek. Almost immediately, they cross over the Satilla River on the Charles Ray King Memorial Bridge. They curve to a nearly due north direction. On a curve back to the north-northwest, they cross over Dryden Creek. They curve to the north and travel through Dixie Union. They curve to the north-northeast and travel on a bridge over Crawley Road and some railroad tracks of CSX Transportation. At an intersection with the northern terminus of Jamestown Road and the southern terminus of Alma–Waycross Highway, they enter Bacon County.

Bacon County
US 1, US 23, and SR 4 cross over Little Hurricane Creek on the PFC Clarence Loran Gaskins Memorial Bridge and then curve to the north-northwest. Upon entering Alma, they pass Bacon County High School Just south of an intersection with the eastern terminus of Floyd Street and the northern terminus of Radio Station Road, they begin a curve to the north-northeast. Just north of this intersection, they meet the southern terminus of SR 4 Alternate (SR 4 Alt.; South Dixon Street). North of 17th Street, they pass the Alma campus of Coastal Pines Technical College. The next block is an intersection with SR 32 (16th Street). Just north of 11th Street, the concurrency passes the Alma/Bacon County Public Library. Between 8th and 6th streets, the highways begin a curve to the north-northwest and pass the Alma Bacon County Welcome Center. They cross over Bear Branch and then meet the western terminus of Magnolia Drive, which leads to the Alma Bacon County Recreation Department. One block later, they intersect the northern terminus of SR 4 Alt. (North Dixon Street) and the western terminus of Camellia Drive. Here, they curve to the north. An intersection with the eastern terminus of Cumberland Road leads to the Bacon County Primary School. A short distance later, they curve to the north-northeast. They leave the city limits of Alma and cross over Hurricane Creek on the Curtis Lee Marion Bridge. They curve to a due north direction and travel on the Jauquion R. "Rab" Tanner Bridge. The highways curve back to the northeast just before an intersection with the southern terminus of SR 19. Here, US 23 departs the concurrency on SR 19. US 1 and SR 4 continue to the northeast and cross over Big Satilla Creek and enter Appling County.

Appling County

US 1 and SR 4 continue to the northeast. Just before an intersection with the eastern terminus of Versie Aldridge Road and the western terminus of Cauley Road, they curve to the north-northeast. Just before an intersection with the eastern terminus of Buck Head Road, they curve back to the northeast. An intersection with the eastern terminus of the appropriately-named Airport Road leads to Baxley Municipal Airport. The highways cross over Blackwater Creek and then curve back to the north-northeast. They cross over Sweetwater Creek and then enter Baxley. An intersection with Johns Lane leads to Appling County Elementary School. At an intersection with Second Street, they begin a second concurrency with SR 15. An intersection with the eastern terminus of Bay Street leads to Lake Mayers Public Park. US 1, SR 4, and SR 15 cross over some railroad tracks of Norfolk Southern Railway just before intersecting US 341/SR 27 (Parker Street). Around an intersection with the eastern terminus of Ivey Street, the three highways curve to the north-northwest. At the northern terminus of Brobston Street, they curve back to the north-northeast. At an intersection with Sursson Street, they temporarily leave the city limits of Baxley. At an intersection with the southern terminus of Nails Ferry Road, they reenter the city. After curving back to the north-northwest, they leave Baxley for the final time. They cross over Tenmile Creek. They curve to a due north direction and cross over Little Tenmile Creek. After crossing over Bay Creek, they cross over an industrial railway. An intersection with the eastern terminus of West River Road leads to Deen's Landing, an Altamaha River waterway public landing. They pass a picnic area just before crossing over the Altamaha River on the Joseph Simmons Alexander Sr. Memorial Bridge to enter Toombs County.

Toombs County

US 1, SR 4, and SR 15 continue to the north-northeast. After crossing over Williams Creek, they enter the unincorporated community of English Eddy. They curve to the north-northwest. Just before an intersection with the western terminus of SR 147 and the eastern terminus of Cedar Crossing Road, they curve to a more northern direction. After leaving English Eddy, they curve to the north-northeast. After crossing over Cobb Creek, the three-highway concurrency, they curve back to the north-northwest. After curving to the north, they enter the unincorporated community of Toombs Central. There, they intersect SR 56. Then, they pass Toombs Central Elementary School and the Toombs County Recreation Department. After leaving Toombs Central, they curve to the north-northwest. In the unincorporated community of South Thompson, they begin a curve back to the north-northeast. They intersect the southern terminus of SR 29. Here, SR 15 splits off onto SR 29. US 1 and SR 4 curve to the northeast and cross over Rocky Creek. They curve back to the north-northeast and cross over Little Rocky Creek. They then travel through Santa Claus. Approximately  later, they enter Lyons. They pass Lyons Upper Elementary School and then curve to the northeast. They meet the western terminus of SR 178 (South Victory Drive). They begin a curve to the north-northwest. An intersection with South Washington Street leads to Partin Park and the Lyons Recreation Department. They intersect US 280/SR 30 (Liberty Avenue). Just after this intersection, US 1 and SR 4 enter downtown Lyons. They cross over some railroad tracks of Georgia Central Railway. Immediately afterward, they intersect SR 292 and the western terminus of SR 152 (Broad Street). After leaving downtown, they pass the Lyons Police Department. Intersections with Cleveland Avenue and Toombs Avenue lead to Toombs County High School's football stadium. Just after leaving Lyons, they cross over Swift Creek and curve to the north-northeast. They intersect the eastern terminus of SR 130 and the western terminus of Resmando Road. The roadway curves to the northeast for a short distance and then resume their north-northeast direction. They cross over Pendleton Creek. They travel through rural areas with agricultural land on both sides of the roadway before entering Emanuel County.

Emanuel County
US 1 and SR 4 immediately curve to the northwest. Just before Harrell Cemetery Road, they curve back to the north-northeast. They enter Oak Park. They begin a curve back to the northwest. Immediately after this curve begins, they cross over Reedy Creek. Then, they curve back to the north-northeast and intersect SR 46/SR 86. Here, SR 46 joins the concurrency. The three highways curve to the northeast and cross over the Ohoopee River. They curve back to the north-northeast and meet a former portion of SR 46. Then, they have an interchange with Interstate 16 (I-16; Jim Gillis Historic Savannah Parkway). Just past this interchange, SR 46 splits off to the east. As of this point, they are known as Bill English Highway. Just after beginning a curve to the north-northwest, they leave Oak Park. They have an intersection with the western terminus of SR 192 and the southern terminus of New Hope Church Road. The concurrency curves back to the north-northeast and crosses over Jacks Creek. Just south of Ivy W. Rountree Road, they curve back to the north-northeast. Just before curving back to the north-northwest, SR 57 joins the concurrency. They curve to the northwest and then intersect the northern terminus of SR 297. Here, they take on the Larry J. "Butch" Parrish Parkway name. They intersect the southern terminus of US 1 Bus./SR 4 Bus., which leads to Swainsboro. They briefly enter the city limits of Swainsboro. There, they intersect Empire Expressway and travel on a bridge over some railroad tracks of the Heart of Georgia Railroad. Just after this, they cross over Crooked Creek. They intersect SR 56 and curve to the north-northwest. After an intersection with US 80/SR 26 on the southwestern edge of the city, US 1, SR 4, and SR 56 travel just to the west of Holloways Pond. They curve to the north-northwest, very briefly reentering the city, and then travel just to the west of Emanuel County Airport. They curve back to the north-northeast and intersect the northern terminus of Kight Road, a former segment of SR 57. At this intersection, SR 57 splits off to the northwest. They then meet the northern terminus of US 1 Bus./SR 4 Bus. The highways curve back to the north-northwest. They meet a former portion of US 1 that travels through Dellwood just before intersecting the western terminus of Dellwood Connector, which leads to Dellwood. On the northern side of Dellwood, they meet this former portion of the highway. They curve to a nearly due north direction and then back to the north-northeast. They travel through the unincorporated community of Blundale. The highways curve to the northwest and then back to the north-northwest. Then, they cross over Rocky Creek to enter Jefferson County.

Jefferson County
US 1 and SR 4 curve to the north-northeast and intersect the southern terminus of US 1 Bus./SR 4 Bus. and the northern terminus of Kennedy Road. They cross over the Williamson Swamp Creek and enter Wadley. Just after a curve to the north-northwest, they travel on a bridge over some railroad tracks of Norfolk Southern Railway. They intersect SR 78 and the northern terminus of US 319 (East Calhoun Street). The two highways curve back to the north-northeast and then back to the north-northwest, just south of an intersection with the northern terminus of Martin Luther King Jr. Boulevard and the southern terminus of Lincoln Park Road. Just after this curve, they intersect the northern terminus of US 1 Bus./SR 4 Bus. They head to the north-northeast and cross over Boggy Gut Creek. They intersect the eastern terminus of Moxley–Bartow Road and the western terminus of Pete Smith Road, the latter of which leads to the unincorporated community of Moxley. In Aldreds, an intersection with the eastern terminus of Walden Brett Road leads to the unincorporated community of Pine Hill. The concurrency curves to a nearly due north direction and meet the northern terminus of a former portion of US 1 before crossing over the Ogeechee River. They curve to the north-northwest and enter Louisville. Immediately, they have an intersection with the southern terminus of US 1 Bus./SR 4 Bus. and the western terminus of Bob Culvern Road. There is no access from Bob Culvern Road to the business routes or vice versa. This intersection is just west of Louisville Municipal Airport. They have an intersection with SR 17 and the eastern terminus of Midville Road. Here, SR 17 joins the concurrency. They travel just east of Lake Marion and intersect SR 24 (Mulberry Street). An intersection with the western terminus of the appropriately-named School Street leads to Louisville Middle School. Just before an intersection with the eastern terminus of Walnut Street and the western terminus of Middleground Road, the roadway begins a curve to the northwest. They curve back to the north-northwest and intersect US 221 and the northern terminus of US 1 Bus./SR 4 Bus. (Peachtree Street). Here, US 221 joins the concurrency. The four highways travel in a nearly due north direction between the Jefferson County Jail and Law Enforcement Facility and the Louisville Golf Club, passing Thomas Jefferson Academy. They then pass the Jefferson County Health Center. They curve to the north-northwest and intersect Clark Mill By-Pass, which leads to the Jefferson County Landfill. Just north of this intersection, the roadway leaves Louisville. They bend to a more northern direction and pass Jones Pond. They curve to the north-northeast and intersect the southern terminus of SR 296. They pass Jefferson County High School just before intersecting the eastern terminus of Warrior Trail, which also leads to the Jefferson County Landfill. They pass Adams Lake and then curve to the northeast before crossing over Big Creek. They curve to the north-northwest and then back to a northern direction. They enter Wrens and curve to the north-northeast. Immediately, they intersect SR 88/SR 540 (Fall Line Freeway), which both join the concurrency. The six highways head into the main part of the city. They cross over some railroad tracks of Norfolk Southern Railway. They curve to the northeast and cross over Brushy Creek. They curve to the north-northeast and intersect the western terminus of Howard Street and the southern terminus of Thomson Highway. Here, SR 17 splits off onto Thomson Highway. Then, they intersect SR 80 (Broad Street). Here, SR 88 splits off to the right. The four highways continue to the northeast and pass Wrens Middle School. The concurrency curves to the northeast and intersects Quaker Road, which functions as a northern bypass of the city. A short distance later, they intersect the eastern terminus of SR 47. Here, US 221 splits off to the north-northwest. US 1, SR 4, and SR 540 cross over Reedy Creek on the Floyd L. Norton Memorial Bridge. An intersection with the southern terminus of Woodland Academy Road and the northern terminus of Camp Ground Road leads to WCES TV 20. They begin paralleling the southeastern edge of Fort Gordon. They then cross over Brier Creek and enter Richmond County and the city limits of Augusta.

Richmond County
US 1, SR 4, and SR 540 curve to the east-northeast and cross over Boggy Gut Creek. After curving back to the northeast, they cross over Sandy Run Creek. Then, they curve to the east, before curving to the east-northeast. The highways leave Augusta, enter the city limits of Blythe, and temporarily leave the edge of Fort Gordon. They intersect the western terminus of Church Street, which leads to Blythe city hall, a U.S. Post Office, and Blythe Elementary School. They begin a curve to the northeast. On this curve, they intersect SR 88 and the southern terminus of Hoods Chapel Road. They leave Blythe and reenter Augusta. They curve to the north-northeast and cross over South Prong Creek. The concurrency begins to parallel the southeastern edge of Fort Gordon again and begins to curve back to the northeast. On this curve, they cross over Spirit Creek. This crossing is just south of Gordon Lakes Golf Course. They intersect the northern terminus of Willis Foreman Road, which is a connector to US 25/SR 121. This is before an interchange with Tobacco Road, which leads to Fort Gordon's Gate 5. Just after this interchange, they have an intersection with a former portion of US 1. They cross over Butler Creek, meet another former portion of US 1, and curve to the east-northeast to an intersection with the northern terminus of Meadowbrook Drive and the southern terminus of Barton Chapel Road. The roadway begins a curve back to the northeast. At an interchange with I-520 (Bobby Jones Expressway; and its unsigned companion designation SR 415), both SR 540 and the Fall Line Freeway end. US 1 and SR 4 pass Augusta Technical College and then intersect Lumpkin Road, which functions as a bypass south of the main part of Augusta. They then meet Wheeless Road, which helps connect the southern and central parts of the city. They pass Hillcrest Memorial Cemetery before meeting the northern terminus of Richmond Hill Road. They cross over Rocky Creek just before intersecting US 78/US 278/SR 10 (Gordon Highway). Here, US 1 turns right onto Gordon Highway, while SR 4 continues into the heart of the city. The four highways curve slightly to the east-southeast to an interchange with US 25/SR 121 (Peach Orchard Road), which both join the concurrency. The six highways take Gordon Highway to the east-northeast and intersect the northern terminus of Doug Barnard Parkway (former SR 56 Spur) and the southern terminus of Molly Pond Road. Gordon Highway curves to the north-northeast and intersects Laney Walker Boulevard, thus effectively entering downtown. It travels just to the northwest of Magnolia Cemetery, Cedar Grove Cemetery, and May Park and southeast of James Brown Arena. A short distance later, they travel to the east of Old Medical College and the Old Government House, then have an interchange with US 25 Bus./SR 28 (Broad Street). Here, US 25 Bus. meets its southern terminus. Just after this interchange, the highway crosses over the Savannah River into South Carolina. At the state line, SR 10, and Gordon Highway end, while US 1, US 25, US 78, and US 278, concurrent with South Carolina Highway 121 (SC 121) travel on the Jefferson Davis Highway to the northeast toward North Augusta.

National Highway System
The entire length of US 1 is part of the National Highway System, a system of routes determined to be the most important for the nation's economy, mobility, and defense.

History

1920s
The roadway that would eventually become US 1/SR 4 was designated at least as early as 1919 as part of SR 15 from the Florida state line to Alma, an unnumbered road from Alma to Baxley, part of SR 17 from Swainsboro to Louisville, and another unnumbered road from Louisville to Augusta. By the end of 1921, SR 32 was proposed on the Alma–Baxley segment. SR 17 was proposed on the Baxley–Swainsboro segment. The portion of SR 24 east of Louisville was shifted northwestward on the previously unnumbered road from Louisville to Augusta. Also, the portion of SR 17 north of Louisville was shifted eastward onto that same road from Louisville to Wrens. By the end of 1926, US 1 was designated on the entire Florida-to-Augusta path. SR 32 was designated from a point north-northeast of Alma to Lyons. SR 17 was designated from Baxley to Wrens. US 78/SR 10/SR 12 was designated from a point west-southwest of Augusta into that city. Three segments of US 1 had a "completed hard surface": a segment south-southeast of the Charlton–Brantley county line, from a point southeast of Waycross into that city, and from a point southwest of Augusta into that city. Two segments had a "completed semi hard surface": from the Florida state line to a point south-southeast of the Charlton–Brantley county line and from just south-southeast of this county line to southeast of Waycross. Two segments had a "sand clay or top soil" surface: from just south of the Ware–Bacon county line to Alma and from the Emanuel–Jefferson county line to Louisville. Four segments were indicated to be under construction: from Waycross to just south of the Ware–Bacon county line, from Alma to Baxley, from Swainsboro to the Emanuel–Jefferson county line, and from Louisville to southwest of Augusta. By the end of 1929, SR 4 was designated from Florida to Augusta. SR 32 was truncated off of US 1 at Alma. SR 24's portion east of Louisville was shifted back to its former routing, off of US 1. SR 17 was truncated off of US 1 at Wrens.

1930s and 1940s
By the middle of 1930, SR 15 was truncated to a point north-northeast of Alma. The entire highway, from the Florida state line to Augusta, had a completed hard surface. In January 1932, SR 17 was placed on a concurrency with US 1/SR 4 from Louisville to a point about halfway between Louisville and Wrens. In 1937, the entire segment from the Florida state line to Waycross was indicated to be under construction. By the end of the year, US 1/US 78/SR 4/SR 10/SR 12 were indicated to have entered the main part of Augusta on Milledgeville Road; they intersected US 25/SR 121 (Savannah Road); all seven highways traveled on Twiggs Street and 7th Street to an intersection with SR 28 (Broad Street); US 1/US 78/SR 4/SR 10/SR 12/SR 28 traveled east-southeast on Broad Street to an intersection with 5th Street; and US 1/US 78/SR 4/SR 10/SR 12 traveled on 5th Street to the South Carolina state line. By the end of 1939, SR 57 was placed on a concurrency with US 1/SR 4 from north of Oak Park to Swainsboro. In 1940, the northern end of the SR 17 concurrency was shifted northward to Wrens. By February 1948, US 301 was placed on a concurrency from the Florida state line to Folkston.

1950s
By August 1950, US 23 was placed on a concurrency from the Florida state line to a point north of Alma. Between September 1953 and June 1954, US 221 was placed on a concurrency from Louisville to Wrens. By June 1955, Gordon Highway was established around the southwest side of Augusta and proposed to the 5th Street/Gwinnett Street intersection. It began on US 78/SR 10/SR 12 (with US 278 newly designated on it) west-southwest of Augusta to US 25/SR 121 south of the city. No numbered highways were indicated to be designated on it, so US 1/SR 4 remained on its previous path. It had an interchange with US 25/SR 21. US 1/US 78/SR 4/SR 10/SR 12 split off of the US 78/US 278/SR 10/SR 12 concurrency just north-northeast of Gwinnett Street, where US 278 reached its eastern terminus. It traveled north-northeast to Calhoun Street, east-southeast to 5th Street, and resumed its 5th Street path, albeit on a more southern starting point. By the middle of 1957, Gordon Highway was completed around the southern and eastern sides of Augusta to 5th Street just north-northeast of Gwinnett Street in the city. US 1/US 25/US 78/US 278 was shifted onto the highway, with SR 4/SR 12 and possibly SR 10 remaining on Milledgeville Road, Twiggs Street, 7th Street, and Broad Street.

1960s
By June 1960, SR 15 was shifted eastward, onto a completely different alignment. It had two different concurrencies with US 1/SR 4: from the Florida state line to Racepond and from Baxley to South Thompson. In Augusta, SR 10 was shifted off of SR 4 and onto Gordon Highway. SR 21 was extended onto the SR 4/SR 12 concurrency on Twiggs Street and 7th Street. SR 21 reached its northern terminus at Broad Street. US 25 was shifted off of Broad Street and onto Gordon Highway, which was extended to the South Carolina state line. Its former path was redesignated as part of US 25 Bus. By June 1963, SR 121 was placed on a concurrency from Folkston to Racepond. By the end of 1965, a western bypass of Waycross was built from US 82/SR 50 west-northwest of the city to US 1/US 23/SR 4 northwest of it. SR 21 was extended west-northwest on US 25 Bus./SR 28 (Broad Street) and followed the business route to the South Carolina state line. SR 121 was extended on Gordon Highway from the US 25/SR 21/SR 121 interchange to the state line. Also, the intersection of Gordon Highway and Broad Street was converted into an interchange.

1970s to 2000s
In 1976, SR 4 Spur was extended around the southwestern and southern edges of Alma to US 1/SR 4 in the southern part of the city. In 1978, a southern bypass of Waycross, designated as SR 714, was established with a "topsoil or gravel" surface from SR 122 west-southwest of the city to US 84/SR 38 southwest of it. It was also proposed from that intersection southeast, east, and northeast to US 1/US 23/SR 4 east-southeast of the city. In 1980, SR 4 Spur was redesignated as SR 4 Alt. The next year, SR 12's eastern terminus was truncated to Thomson. SR 21's northern terminus was truncated to Millen. SR 4's Milledgeville Road portion was truncated to the 15th Street intersection. It was routed on 15th Street, Walton Way, and then resumed its 13th Street path, just with a more southerly starting point. In 1982, SR 714 was proposed to be extended west-northwest just north of the path of US 82/SR 50. In 1985, US 82/SR 50 through Waycross were rerouted, replacing all of SR 714's actual and proposed segments. In 1992, a western bypass of Waycross, designated as SR 896, was proposed from US 82/SR 520 west-northwest of the city to US 1/US 23/SR 4 northwest of it. In 1996, US 1/US 23/SR 4 was rerouted in the southern part of Waycross and north-northwest on the path of SR 896. Their former path became US 1 Bus./US 23 Bus./SR 4 Bus. In 2003, a western bypass of Swainsboro was proposed. The next year, US 1/SR 4 was shifted onto this bypass. Their former path through the city became US 1 Bus./SR 4 Bus.

Future
The portion from the southern part of Wrens to the central part of Augusta is part of the Fall Line Freeway, a highway that connects Columbus and Augusta. This portion may eventually be incorporated into the proposed eastern extension of I-14, which is currently entirely within Central Texas and may be extended into Augusta.

Widening project (Wadley to Wrens) 

The Georgia Department of Transportation (GDOT) will widen  of US 1/SR 4 from north of Wadley to Wrens and will be a total of $17 million in budget. This project will widen US 1/SR 4 from two lanes to a four-lane road (each having  in width). Currently, GDOT has an ongoing plan to widen all of US 1/SR 4 to four lanes (with bypasses) with more than half of it complete. In a few years, it will be complete, and they will move on to the next phase. This project will be completed on September 30, 2022.

Major intersections

State Route 4

SR 4 is completely concurrent with US 1 from the Florida state line to the main part of Augusta. There, it is one of the main highways through the Medical District. It provides access to T. W. Josey High School, Paine College, the Medical College of Georgia, Augusta University Medical Center, the VA Medical Center, the Augusta University Annex building, and John S. Davidson Fine Arts Magnet School. It helps connect downtown Augusta with the western part of North Augusta, South Carolina.

See also
 
 
 Special routes of U.S. Route 1

References

External links

 1 Georgia
01
Transportation in Charlton County, Georgia
Transportation in Ware County, Georgia
Transportation in Bacon County, Georgia
Transportation in Appling County, Georgia
Transportation in Toombs County, Georgia
Transportation in Emanuel County, Georgia
Transportation in Jefferson County, Georgia
Transportation in Richmond County, Georgia
Transportation in Augusta, Georgia